"Hands Out of My Pocket" was a 1994 single from Australian rock band Cold Chisel, the first from the album Teenage Love. It reached number 9 in the Australian charts.

Details
Teenage Love was a compilation album that collected studio recordings, many just demos, that the band had previously not released. "Hands Out of My Pocket" was originally demoed for the album East and was included in some later reissues of the album as a bonus track. Don Walker later said the song was really only played once and author Jimmy Barnes can be heard yelling out chord changes on the recording.

Glenn A. Baker said the song was inspired by, "a bizarre incident on Christmas Day where a Hare Krishna cousin of Jimmy's conducted a self-immolation rite in a bathtub."

Charts

Recording credits
 Jimmy Barnes -  vocals
 Ian Moss - guitar
 Don Walker - piano
 Steve Prestwich - drums
 Phil Small - bass

Footnotes

Cold Chisel songs
Songs written by Jimmy Barnes
Song recordings produced by Mark Opitz